Sebastiania klotzschiana is a species of flowering plant in the family Euphorbiaceae. It was originally described as Gymnanthes klotzschiana Müll.Arg. in 1863. It is native to Brazil and northern Argentina.

References

Plants described in 1863
Flora of Argentina
Flora of Brazil
klotzschiana